Charles Herman Weisse (October 24, 1866 – October 8, 1919) was a U.S. Representative from Wisconsin.

Born near Sheboygan Falls, Wisconsin, Weisse attended the public schools and St. Paul Lutheran School.
In 1880, he started to work in a tannery and later became a partner in 1888.
He served as president of the city council of Sheboygan Falls, Wisconsin from 1893 to 1896.
He was treasurer of the school board from 1897 till 1900.
He served as delegate to the Democratic National Conventions in 1904 and 1908.
He was an unsuccessful Democratic candidate for election in 1900 to the Fifty-seventh Congress.

Weisse was elected as a Democrat to the Fifty-eighth and to the three succeeding Congresses (March 4, 1903 – March 3, 1911). He represented Wisconsin's 6th congressional district. He was not a candidate for renomination in 1910 to the Sixty-second Congress.
He engaged in the manufacture of leather and in various other business enterprises in his native city.
Weisse was accidentally killed in Sheboygan Falls, Wisconsin, on October 8, 1919.
He was interred in Falls Cemetery.

References

External links

1905 photo

1866 births
1919 deaths
People from Sheboygan Falls, Wisconsin
Businesspeople from Wisconsin
Wisconsin city council members
School board members in Wisconsin
Democratic Party members of the United States House of Representatives from Wisconsin
Accidental deaths in Wisconsin
19th-century American politicians
19th-century American businesspeople